Vladimir Vladimirovich Lobanov (December 26, 1953 – August 29, 2007) was a Russian speed skater who competed for the Soviet Union in the 1980 Winter Olympics, in European and World all round championships between 1977 and 1979, and in Sprint World Championships 1981 and 1982.

In 1980 he won the bronze medal in the 1000 metres event. In the 1500 metres competition he finished eighth. He placed fifth in both the World and the European all round Championships 1978, and in the Sprint World Championships 1981.

References
Vladimir Lobanov's profile at Sports Reference.com

1953 births
2007 deaths
Soviet male speed skaters
Olympic speed skaters of the Soviet Union
Speed skaters at the 1980 Winter Olympics
Olympic bronze medalists for the Soviet Union
Olympic medalists in speed skating
Medalists at the 1980 Winter Olympics